Glenorchy may refer to:

Glen Orchy, a glen in Scotland containing the River Orchy
City of Glenorchy, a local government area of Tasmania, Australia
Glenorchy, Tasmania, the suburb contained within the local government area
Glenorchy, Victoria, a town in Australia
Glenorchy, New Zealand is a town bordering Lake Wakatipu in the South Island of New Zealand

Sports Teams

Glenorchy Camanachd, a shinty club from Scotland
Glenorchy Football Club, an Australian Rules Football Club